Krupa na Uni is a municipality in northern Republika Srpska, an entity of Bosnia and Herzegovina. It is situated in the north-western part of the Republika Srpska entity and the central part of the Bosanska Krajina region. The seat of the municipality is the village of Donji Dubovik.

History
It was created in 1995 from part of the pre-war municipality of Bosanska Krupa (the other part of the pre-war municipality that is now in the entity of Federation of Bosnia and Herzegovina). As of 2019, it is one of the smallest municipalities by number of inhabitants in Republika Srpska.

Geography

It is located between the municipality of Bosanska Krupa to the south and west, the municipality of Novi Grad to the north, and the municipality of Oštra Luka to the east.

Demographics

Population

Ethnic composition

Notable people

Pecija, revolutionary
Branko Ćopić, Bosnian and Yugoslav writer
Gojko Kličković, former President of the Government of Republika Srpska
Velimir Stojnić, National Hero of Yugoslavia

See also
 Subdivisions of Bosnia and Herzegovina
 Municipalities of Republika Srpska

References

External links 

 

 
Municipalities of Republika Srpska